Grand Plain may refer to one of the following.
Grand Plain Township, Minnesota
Pannonian Plain, when literally translated from local languages.